The 2012 Rallye de France – Alsace was the eleventh round of the 2012 World Rally Championship season. The rally took place over 4–7 October, and was based in Strasbourg, the capital city of the Alsace region of France. The rally was also the seventh round of the Super 2000 World Rally Championship, and the fifth round of the WRC Academy.

Victor Sébastien Loeb retained his driver champion title in this rally, and the third place of his teammate Mikko Hirvonen allowed Citroën to retain the manufacturer title as well, making this rally a repeat of the 2010 event.

Results

Event standings

 Note:  – The WRC Academy featured the two first legs of the rally.

Special stages

Power stage
The Power stage was a 17.08 km stage run through the Vignoble de Cleebourg. The three fastest crews through this stage were awarded by drivers' championship points. Ott Tänak was the fastest driver through the stage, earning three additional championship points. Thierry Neuville was second, while Mads Østberg finished third.

References

External links 
 
 Rallye de France at WRC.com
 Rallye de France at JUWRA.com

France
Rally
Rallye de France Alsace